Old Mackinac Point Light is a deactivated lighthouse located at the northern tip of the Lower Peninsula in the U.S. state of Michigan.  The lighthouse is part of Fort Michilimackinac State Park in the village of Mackinaw City just east of the Mackinac Bridge.

The lighthouse was constructed in 1892 along the Straits of Mackinac at the junction of Lake Michigan and Lake Huron.  It was deactivated in 1957 and currently serves as a museum.

History

Preparations
Even before the advent of European explorers, the Straits of Mackinac were a significant hazard to water borne travelers.  Consequently, before lighthouses, the Ojibwa lit the shore with fires.

In the early 19th century, with large vessel traffic increasing from Lake Huron into the Straits, the first step in guarding the Straits was taken in 1829, through the construction of Bois Blanc Lighthouse to both guide mariners in making the westerly turn into the Straits, and to warn them of the shoals and shallows surrounding the island.

Three years later in 1832, Congress acted on Stephen Pleasonton’s recommendation that a lightship be placed on Waugoshance Shoal as the first attempt to mark the western entrance to the Straits. In 1838, Lieutenant James T. Homans reported that the lightship was wholly inadequate. He recommended a better solution for Waugoshance and also that a light be built on the point to the west of Mackinaw Harbor. Nothing came of Homans' recommendations.

Construction
In 1889, the United States Lighthouse Board realized that Mackinaw Point was a better location. Their first inclination was to put a fog signal there, but when asking Congress for funding, they requested funding for both a fog signal and a first class lighthouse. Congress chose to accept their recommendation, but only voted the funding for a steam-powered fog-signal.  The fog signal was built in 1890.  The signal proved to be exceptionally necessary for navigation in the often fog-choked Straits of Mackinac; during one exceptionally humid fortnight, the Old Mackinac Point signal personnel reported burning 52 cords of stove wood in order to keep steam up for the foghorn.

The lighthouse "grew out of the fog station." In March 1891, Congress finally authorized the funding for a light station and the board acted quickly. Bidding was difficult, but in 1892, "on a foundation of ashlar limestone, the tower and attached keeper’s dwelling were both constructed of Cream City brick, trimmed with Indiana Limestone. The lens is a fourth order Fresnel Lens.

Deactivation and preservation
The completion of the Mackinac Bridge in 1957 eliminated the need for the light. Since the Mackinac Bridge has lights on it at night, the bridge became a much better aid to navigation than the light.

In 1960, the lighthouse property was purchased by the Mackinac Island State Park Commission, incorporating it into surrounding Fort Michilimackinac State Park.  The Old Mackinac Point Lighthouse was added to the National Register of Historic Places in November 1969, as Reference #69000068 (listed as: Mackinac Point Lighthouse).

It is also a registered Michigan Historic Landmark. The Michigan Historical Marker on site states:

Mackinac Point Lighthouse.  The lighthouse complex, including the lightkeeper's quarters and tower, was reopened to the public in 2004 by Mackinac State Historic Parks as part of the Fort Michilimackinac complex.  The light's original Fresnel lens is on display.  An admission fee is charged.

A state historical marker was erected in 1972.  It is Registered Site S0377.  The marker states:
"This lighthouse is opposite the turning point for ships making the difficult passage through the Straits of Mackinac, one of the busiest crossroads of the Great Lakes. McGulpin Point Light, two miles to the west, had been established in 1856, but it was not visible from all directions. In 1889 Congress appropriated funds for the construction of a steam-powered fog signal here, which went into operation on November 5, 1890. Construction of the light tower and attached lightkeepers' dwelling began, and the light was first displayed on October 25, 1892. Heavy iron and brass castings were used throughout the structure, and the light was visible to ships sixteen miles away. In operation until 1958, the lighthouse is now a maritime museum."

In 2000, serious restoration was undertaken, with the intent of restoring it to its appearance around 1910.  The lighthouse is reopened to the public, and the castle-style structure, which design is unique in the Great Lakes was restored. the first floor is fully accessible, and includes period furnishings and accoutrement, plus hands-on exhibits that test one's nighttime navigation skills, light a miniature Fresnel lens, and put on Lighthouse keeper clothing. Historic interpreters lead tours up the tower and into the lantern room.

Starting in 2018, major exterior and interior masonry restoration was undertaken by National Restoration Inc.

Current status and getting there

Adjacent to the Mackinac Bridge, the park offers a good view of the bridge and boat traffic.

Admission is through the 1907 Fog Signal Building, which houses the museum store. An admission fee is charged.  Pets are welcome.

The tower is open to the public.

The lighthouse is located within Michilimackinac State Park, just a few hundred feet east of the Mackinac Bridge and the Colonial Michilimackinac Visitors Center. At this time the light is a museum run by Mackinac Parks Commission.

Because of its prime location and exposure to tourists, plus its unique picturesque form and color, it is the subject of photographs, drawings, and needlepoint illustrations. Historical photographs are a prominent feature of the Mackinac Island State Park Commission website.

An exciting and expensive alternative is to charter a seaplane to make a tour of the Mackinac Straits and environs.

See also
 Great Lakes Storm of 1913
 Shipwrecks of the 1913 Great Lakes storm
 List of victims of the 1913 Great Lakes storm
 Lighthouses in the United States

Further reading
 "A Tour of the Lights of the Straits." Michigan History 70 (Sep/Oct 1986), pp. 17–29.
 Brisson, Steven (2001) Brief history, Old Mackinac Point Lighthouse, Mackinac Parks, Mackinac Island State Park Commission.  Adapted from: Old Mackinac Point Light Station. Mackinac History: A Continuing Series of Illustrated Vignettes. Vol. III, no. 5. Mackinac Island: Mackinac Island State Park Commission.
 Brisson, Steven C. (Mackinac State Historic Parks chief curator).  Old Mackinac Point Lighthouse: A History & Pictorial Souvenir (1/29/2008).
Hyde, Charles K., and Ann and John Mahan. The Northern Lights: Lighthouses of the Upper Great Lakes. Detroit: Wayne State University Press, 1995. pp. 36–46.   .

References

External links

 History and current information about Old Mackinac Point Lighthouse.
 Aerial photos, Old Mackinac Point Light, marinas.com.
 Huelse, Klaus -- Meine Leuchtturm-Seite: Leuchttürme USA auf historischen Postkarten -- Historic postcard images of U.S. lighthouses, Historic Post Card View — Old Mackinac Point Lighthouse.
 Interactive map of lighthouses in northern Lake Michigan.
 Lake Huron Northern Lighthouses Mapped by Google
 Lighthouses in the Mackinac Straits, Lighthouse Friends.
 List and information for lighthouses in northern Lake Michigan.
 Mackinac Parks, Old Mackinac Point Lighthouse, official website.
 Satellite view, Google Maps.
 Old Mackinac Point Lighthouse - United States Lighthouses

Lighthouses completed in 1892
Houses completed in 1892
Lighthouses on the National Register of Historic Places in Michigan
Lighthouse museums in Michigan
Museums in Cheboygan County, Michigan
National Register of Historic Places in Cheboygan County, Michigan
Michigan State Historic Sites